Osvaldas Mikolovich Pikauskas (1945–1995) was a Soviet and Russian military leader of Lithuanian origin who served as first deputy commander of the Airborne Troops from January 1991 to March 1995.

Biography
Osvaldas Pikauskas was born in the village of Duburiai in Soviet Lithuania in 1945 and joined the Soviet Army in 1964 as a private. He graduated from an airborne troops officer school in Ryazan in 1969 and went on to study at the Frunze Military Academy in Moscow. He was promoted to major-general at age thirty-eight. He commanded the 98th Guards Airborne Division between 1982 and 1985.

Pikauskas was made deputy commander of the Soviet Airborne Troops (VDV) in January 1991 as a lieutenant-general. He continued his career in the Russian Federation following the dissolution of the Soviet Union in 1991 as a colonel-general of the Russian Army.

He died in March 1995.

References

External links
"Ne izminivshy prisyage". Litovsky kuryer No. 32 (754).

1945 births
1995 deaths
Russian colonel generals
Russian people of Lithuanian descent
Soviet lieutenant generals
Frunze Military Academy alumni